Hasan Zaidi  (born 28 September 1978) is an Indian television actor who is known for his roles in Khotey Sikkey and Hum Ne Li Hai...Shapath.

Life and family
Zaidi was born in Aligarh and hails from Hardoi near Lucknow, U.P. He spent a his early childhood in Muscat, Oman. Zaidi was always in the school drama society, which led him eventually to his acting career. He was also actively involved in theatre since an early age. He used to perform in plays during his school and college days. Before landing up in Mumbai as an actor, Zaidi finished his bachelor of tourism and hospitality management from Eastern Mediterranean University in Cyprus.

Zaidi got married in April 2009 to Christina, an Austrian, who works for an NGO in Mumbai. The couple is blessed with a daughter, Naila.

Career
Zaidi made his acting debut in 2003 with Star Plus series Kyun Hota Hai Pyarrr. However, he got his first television breakthrough role as Sachin Chaudhary in the year 2007 with the serial Ghar Ek Sapnaa. Zaidi made his film debut in 2004 with the bollywood film Kyun! Ho Gaya Na....

In 2013, Zaidi debuted in theatre by becoming a part of the popular play Kknock Kknock which just had two characters, Rajesh Khera being the other actor. It gave Zaidi the opportunity to showcase his talent and brought him a lot of acclaim for his acting chops.

Filmography

Television

Films

Theatre

Web–Series

Short–Films

References

External links
 

Living people
Indian male television actors
People from Aligarh
Male actors from Mumbai
1978 births
Eastern Mediterranean University alumni
Twelvers
Indian Shia Muslims
Indian expatriates in Northern Cyprus